Founded in June 2011, THQ Nordic is an Austrian video game publisher based in Vienna that acts as the primary publishing arm of Swedish holding company Embracer Group. THQ Nordic GmbH, originally Nordic Games GmbH, changed its name to THQ Nordic in 2016 to better reflect its games portfolio. The company publishes original games, as well as ports and remasters of older intellectual property it acquired.

Games published

Games distributed

Notes

References

See also 
 List of Deep Silver games

 
THQ Nordic